Juan Verdugo Pérez (born 22 May 1949) is a Spanish former professional footballer who played as a  defender.

Career
A footballer from Córdoba, Spain, Verdugo Pérez is more known for having played for Real Madrid and Espanyol.

He represented the Spain national team in a match against Norway in 1978.

As a football manager, he led Córdoba CF in 1998 and 2001.

Honours
Real Madrid
 Primera División (2): 1971–72, 1974–75
 Copa del Generalísimo (2): 1973–74, 1974–75

References

External links
 
 
 
 Juan Verdugo Pérez coach profile at BeSoccer

1949 births
Living people
Footballers from Córdoba, Spain
Spanish footballers
Spain international footballers
Córdoba CF players
Real Madrid CF players
RCD Espanyol footballers
La Liga players
Segunda División players
Association football defenders
Spanish football managers
Córdoba CF managers
Segunda División managers